Varawut Silpa-archa is a Thai politician. , he serves as Minister of Natural Resources and Environment in the second cabinet of Prime Minister Prayut Chan-o-cha.

Early life and education 
Varawut Silpa-archa was born on 11 July 1973 at Bang Khun Phrom Subdistrict, Phra Nakhon District, Bangkok. He is the youngest son of Banharn Silpa-archa, former leader of the Chart Thai Party and former Prime Minister of Thailand with Khunying Jamsai Silpa-archa. Family life, married to Suwanna Silpa-archa have 3 children. Varawut graduated from primary and secondary grades 1-2 from Saint Gabriel's College and attending high school in England. He holds a bachelor's degree in B.Eng. (Mechanical Engineering), University College London, UK and a master's degree MBA in Finance and Banking, University of Wisconsin–Madison.

Political careers 
Varawut entered the political path following his father by being a member of the House of Representatives Suphan Buri Province in 2001, 2005 and 2007 under the Thai Nation Party and received the position of Deputy Minister of Transport in the government of Prime Minister Somchai Wongsawat. In 2008, he was disqualified from politics for five years because he was an executive director of the Chart Thai Party, which the Constitutional Court judges decided to dissolve the party. Later, in the 2019 Thai general election, he was elected on the party-list system and was appointed Minister of Natural Resources and Environment in the government of Prime Minister Prayut Chan-o-cha.

References 

Living people
1973 births
Place of birth missing (living people)
Varawut Silpa-archa
Varawut Silpa-archa
Varawut Silpa-archa
Varawut Silpa-archa
Varawut Silpa-archa
Varawut Silpa-archa